Jules Levy may refer to:

 Jules Levy (musician) (1838–1903), British cornetist, teacher, and composer
 Jules Levy (producer) (1923–2003), American television and film producer
 Jules Lévy (writer), French writer and publisher who founded the Incoherents art movement in 1882.

See also
Jules Levey (1896–1975), American film producer